Tamara Dorofejev (born 9 June 1984 in Budapest) is a Hungarian former competitive figure skater. She is the 2001 Hungarian national champion. She won five medals on the ISU Junior Grand Prix (JGP) series, including gold in Bulgaria, and qualified for three JGP Finals. At ISU Championships, her highest placement was fourth, at the 2000 Junior Worlds, and her highest result on the senior level was ninth at the 2000 Europeans. She began skating at age three.

Programs

Results
GP: Grand Prix; JGP: Junior Series/Junior Grand Prix

References

External links

Navigation

Hungarian female single skaters
1984 births
Living people
Figure skaters from Budapest